Annalee Skarin (born Annalee Kohlepp: July 7, 1899 – died January 17, 1988), was an American Latter-day Saint writer of mysticism and New Age literature. Her 1948 book Ye Are Gods was popular among some members of The Church of Jesus Christ of Latter-day Saints living in Utah, but leaders of the Church felt it had serious doctrinal flaws and her refusal to renounce the principles taught in the book led to her excommunication. The underlying theme in all of her writings was a desire to understand the deeper meaning behind scripture. She wrote: "There was just that intense feeling that something was required of us and we had to find out what it was." Skarin was a member of the Church of Jesus Christ of Latter-day Saints (LDS Church) who served as a missionary in California, and later was a ward Relief Society president. As of 2014, Ye Are Gods was in its 18th printing, though her later books were more popular among non-Latter-day Saints in the New Age movement. She accepted no royalties, and it remains unclear who, if anyone, profited from her many successful books.

Early life
Skarin was born in American Falls, Idaho, the seventh of twelve children. Her parents were Frederick John Kohlepp and Mary Ella Hickman, her grandfather was "Wild Bill" Hickman. Annalee's eldest sister, Minerva Teichert, was an accomplished artist with paintings on display in many temples of The Church of Jesus Christ of Latter-day Saints.

Career

Ye Are Gods 
Skarin self-published her first book, Ye Are Gods, in 1948. Correspondence indicates that this was soon followed by a second volume in 1949. She published a new edition in 1952 that combined the two volumes. This edition removed explicit references to the LDS Church but still widely quoted early LDS leaders and scripture. The content of these books was central to her excommunication in 1952.

Excommunication
Skarin's daughter, Hope Hilton and her husband, Lynn M. Hilton, submitted a unfavorable study they had made of Annalee's book to LDS apostle and president of the Deseret News, Mark E. Petersen. Petersen gave Annalee the choice of renouncing her writing as the work of Satan, or facing excommunication.

"In the spring of 1952 Annalee was visiting friends, Chris and Sally Franchow, in Salt Lake City who lived on Ninth East [3140 South 900 East], just across from the Hillcrest Ward [3151 South 900 East]. As news of her visit became known, she was besieged with invitations to speak at Church and fireside groups. Then without warning the axe fell. After addressing an enthusiastic congregation, she was ushered into the bishop’s office where she was confronted by Elder Mark E. Petersen, a member of the Council of the Twelve. He denounced Ye Are Gods as inspired by Satan, and demanded that she repent and repudiate the book. 'And then it was that I, who love Christ above all others,' she wrote, 'was acclaimed to be the great anti-Christ.' When she rejected the ultimatum, she was tried by a Church court and excommunicated in June 1952.

"Annalee  called it a 'kangaroo court,' where I was refused counsel. My efforts to bear witness to what I had written, or even to defend myself, were denied and silenced.' When Sally Franchow tried to defend her, 'For her courageous efforts she too was excommunicated.'"

The definitive reasons for Annalee Skarin's excommunication are contained in the Church Court's transcript, which Petersen refused to release. This essay was written seven months after Annalee's excommunication in response to letters requesting an explanation for his actions.

Petersen begins his essay, pages 2–5, by describing the difficulties inherent in establishing a church based on personal revelation. Soon after the establishment of the LDS Church several members began to have revelations. That might sound like a good thing but the content of those revelations conflicted with Joseph Smith's leadership. The Lord resolved this issue through Smith receiving revelation that only his revelations affecting church members were real, all others were of the devil. His status as the sole revelator would pass to his successors and he could appoint substitute revelators as needed.

Petersen concludes that since LDS President George Albert Smith did not appoint Annalee Skarin to be a revelator, her books could only be inspired by the devil.

Skarin sent copies of her books to all the church leaders. In an October 12, 1949 letter to her daughter Hope, she wrote, "From many have come beautiful letters --- the one from President George Albert Smith was filled with love and kindness." She also referred to letters from apostle (later to be President) Spencer W. Kimball and from "Stake, Mission, and Temple Presidents…". Skarin was excommunicated by Petersen after Smith's death.

Personal life 
Annalee Skarin married William Michael "Mikey" Gorman on July 15, 1916; the marriage was annulled in 1920. Her second marriage, arranged by her mother, was to Hugo Joseph Avarell on August 31, 1922 in Salt Lake City. It ended in divorce after 21 years. Her final marriage was to Reason E. Skarin on October 18, 1943 in Buffalo, New York.

Her elder daughter, Hope (Avarell) Hilton, was actively involved in Skarin's excommunication. Her younger daughter, Linda Lee (Avarell) Moat, was the child described suffering from a severe illness in Ye Are Gods. "Dear God, this child is Yours first -- and then she is mine. If you want her -- take her -- I love her so! But all that I have is Thine."

After her excommunication, Skarin used the alias Nansela Mathews to prevent Hope Hilton from discovering her whereabouts.

Works 
 The Pathway of Glory Annalee Skarin, compiled from 1933–1946, self-published, eventually formed the basis for Ye Are Gods.
 Ye Are Gods, self-published, 1948
 Ye Are Gods (published by De Vorss and Co, 1952) As of 2014 this book was in its 18th printing.
 Sons Of God, by Christine Mercie (published by De Vorss and Co, 1954) A drama written by Annalee Skarin under a pen name. This was Annalee's first book written after her excommunication, as of 2003 it was in its 23rd printing.
 To God The Glory (published by De Vorss and Co, 1956)
 Temple Of God (published by De Vorss and Co, 1958)
 Secrets Of Eternity (published by De Vorss and Co, 1960)
 Celestial Song Of Creation (published by De Vorss and Co, 1962)
 Man Triumphant (published by De Vorss and Co, 1966)
 Beyond Mortal Boundaries (published by De Vorss and Co, 1969)
 The Book Of Books (published by De Vorss and Co, 1972)
 Pathway of the GODS, Vol 1 date unknown 1995
 Pathway of the GODS, Vol 2 date unknown 1995

References

External links
 Samuel W. Taylor "The Puzzle of Annalee Skarin: Was She Translated Correctly?" Sunstone, Volume 15:1 (April 1991): 41–46.
 Annalee Skarin – a short biography by New Age teacher Robert Coon

1899 births
1988 deaths
People from American Falls, Idaho
Writers from Idaho
American Latter Day Saints
Women mystics
New Age writers
People excommunicated by the Church of Jesus Christ of Latter-day Saints
Mormon mystics